The Jinshan Nuclear Power Plant or Chin Shan Nuclear Power Plant (金山核能發電廠), First Nuclear Power Plant (第一核能發電廠 or 核一), is a nuclear power plant being definitely shutdown in Shimen District, New Taipei, Taiwan. Commissioned in 1978, the plant was Taiwan's first and smallest nuclear power plant.

Construction
The village of Qianhua, in Shimen District, Taipei, primarily populated by a family surnamed Lien, was demolished to construct the Jinshan Nuclear Power Plant as a response to the 1970s energy crisis, and incorporated into the Ten Major Construction Projects in 1973.

Generation
Jinshan began generating power on 16 November 1977, and started commercial operations in December 1978.

The power plant can generate 9 billion kWh of electricity per year.

The two spent fuel pools at the plant have 3,074 and 3,076 spent nuclear fuel assemblies, respectively, with a maximum storage of 3,083 assemblies per pool.

Decommissioning plan

Taipower, as the operator of the power plant, was required by the Radiation Monitoring Center of the Atomic Energy Council to hand in the 2018 decommissioning plans for the plant by December 2015 for the authority to review all of the plans before the decommissioning date. Once the reactors have been shut down,  the plant should be dismantled within 25 years.

Taipower plans to allocate NT$18.2 billion for the disposal of nuclear waste from the decommissioned plant over the next 25 years. Currently Taipower is doing feasibility study of building a nuclear waste storage facility on an uninhabited island around Taiwan.

Events

The July 2013 Typhoon Soulik caused a trip to the generator and turbine of the power plant Unit-2 because one suspension ground line failed and hit the transmission line when the typhoon hit the island on 13–14 July. The typhoon also caused the seawater inlet to be blocked by large amount of debris and damaged three fine filters, traveling filter rake and the plant's switchyard. The damage caused the plant to be offline for several days.

In August 2013, it was reported that there might have been radioactive water leaks for three years from the storage pools of the nuclear power plant's two reactors. Official from Taipower said that the water might come from different sources, such as condensation water or water used for cleaning up the floors. The water however has been collected in a reservoir next to the storage pools used for spent nuclear rods and has been recycled back into the storage pools, thus is claimed to pose no threat to the environment.

In December 2013, the circulating pump of the second reactor tripped due to the low lube oil pressure which caused a built-in lube oil pump. The Atomic Energy Council was criticized due to their very slow respond in giving answers to the public only 10 hours after the trip.

On 4 August 2016, smoke rose out from the power plant resulted from unstable voltage frequency which caused external circuit breakers to trip and produced smoke.

See also

 Energy in Taiwan
 List of power stations in Taiwan
 Nuclear power in Taiwan
 Electricity sector in Taiwan

References

1978 establishments in Taiwan
2019 disestablishments in Taiwan
Buildings and structures in New Taipei
Energy infrastructure completed in 1978
Nuclear power stations in Taiwan